Dmitri Aleksandrovich Sennikov (born 24 June 1976) is a former Russian international association football defender best known for his performances for Lokomotiv Moscow, where he spent a total of 11 seasons.

Club career
Dmitri Sennikov was born in Leningrad (now Saint Petersburg) and graduated from Zenit football school. He was not signed by any professional club and continued playing football as a hobby. In 1996, he was invited to Lokomotiv Saint Petersburg, a First Division team. After two years at the club, he accepted the offer of CSKA Moscow. However, Sennikov failed to become a first-team regular and was loaned to Shinnik Yaroslavl after half a season. In 1999, he transferred to another First Division club, Rubin Kazan.

In 2000, Sennikov returned to Moscow, having accepted an offer from Lokomotiv, a team for which he went on to make more than 200 appearances in all competitions. On 21 December 2010, following the expiration of his last contract with the club, he announced his retirement as a player.

International career
Sennikov's first game for the national team was on 27 March 2002, an away friendly against Estonia. He has played for Russia at the 2002 FIFA World Cup and Euro 2004. He made his final appearance for the team on 12 October 2005, in a decisive 2006 FIFA World Cup qualification away match against Slovakia, which resulted in a goalless draw and subsequent elimination of Russia from the competition.

Playing style
In his prime, a hard-working, tall, fast, physically strong, energetic, and tenacious defender, he could play any defensive position in any formation; a center back or a full-back on either flank.

Honours
Lokomotiv Moscow
Russian Premier League: 2002, 2004
Russian Cup: 1999–2000, 2000–01, 2006–07
Russian Super Cup:  2003, 2005
CIS Cup: 2005

Career statistics

References

External links
 Official website 
 Club profile
 Profile at RussiaTeam 
 Russia – Record International Players

Russian footballers
1976 births
Living people
Footballers from Saint Petersburg
PFC CSKA Moscow players
FC Shinnik Yaroslavl players
FC Rubin Kazan players
FC Lokomotiv Moscow players
Russia under-21 international footballers
Russia international footballers
2002 FIFA World Cup players
UEFA Euro 2004 players
Russian Premier League players
Association football defenders
FC Lokomotiv Saint Petersburg players